On 17 February 1978, a British Army Gazelle helicopter, serial number XX404, went down near Jonesborough, County Armagh, Northern Ireland, after being fired at by a Provisional IRA unit from the South Armagh Brigade. The IRA unit was involved at the time in a gun battle with a Green Jackets observation post deployed in the area, and the helicopter was sent in to support the ground troops. The helicopter crashed after the pilot lost control of the aircraft whilst evading ground fire.

Lieutenant-Colonel Ian Douglas Corden-Lloyd, 2nd Battalion Green Jackets commanding officer, died in the crash. The incident was overshadowed in the press by the La Mon restaurant bombing, which took place just hours later near Belfast.

Background 
By early 1978, the British Army forces involved in Operation Banner had recently replaced their ageing Bell H-13 Sioux helicopters for the more versatile Aérospatiale Gazelles. The introduction of the new machines increased the area covered on a reconnaissance sortie as well as the improved time spent in airborne missions. In the same period, the Provisional IRA received its first consignment of M60 machine guns from the Middle East, which were displayed by masked volunteers during a Bloody Sunday commemoration in Derry. Airborne operations were crucial for the British presence along the border, especially in south County Armagh, where the level of IRA activity meant that every supply and soldier had to be ferried in and out of their bases by helicopter since 1975.

The Royal Green Jackets had been in South Armagh since December 1977, and had already seen some action. Just a few days after arrival, two mortar rounds hit the C Company base at Forkhill, injuring a number of soldiers. In the aftermath of the attack, two Royal Ulster Constabulary (RUC) officers were wounded by a booby-trap while recovering the lorry where the mortar tubes were mounted. Two days later, a patrol near the border suffered a bomb and gun attack, leaving the commanding sergeant with severe head wounds. The sergeant was picked up from the scene by helicopter. He was later invalided from the British Army as a result of his injuries.

Shooting and crash
On 17 January 1978, a Green Jackets observation post deployed around the village of Jonesborough began to take heavy fire from the "March Wall", which drew parallel with the Irish border to the east, along the Dromad woods. The soldiers returned fire, but the short distance to the border and the open ground prevented them from advancing.

The Commanding Officer, Lieutenant Colonel Ian Corden-Lloyd, along with Captain  Schofield and Sergeant Ives flew from the battalion base at Bessbrook Mill to assess the situation and provide information to the troops. They were escorted by a Scout helicopter with an Airborne Reaction Force (ARF), comprising a medic and three soldiers from the 2nd Bn Light Infantry. While hovering over the scene of the engagement, the Gazelle received a barrage of 7.62 mm tracer rounds. The pilot lost control of the aircraft during a turn at high speed to avoid the stream of fire. The Gazelle (serial number XX404) hit a wall and crashed on a field, some 2 km from Jonesborough. According to the crew and passengers of the Scout, the Gazelle hit the ground twice after losing power, with its rotor blades trashing into the soil following the second impact, and then cartwheeled across the field. The Scout landed the ARF still under IRA fire. The soldiers rushed to the wrecked helicopter, some 100 metres away from the site of the initial crash.     

Corden-Lloyd was killed and the other two passengers were wounded. The machine came to rest on its right side. The pilot remained trapped inside the wreckage, but he survived thanks to his helmet. The IRA later claimed they had shot at the helicopter with an M60 machine gun. The IRA unit vanished into the Dromad woods to the Republic of Ireland. Some Gardaí witnessed the attack from the other side of the border.

Aftermath
The gun battle and Gazelle shootdown was displaced from the headlines by the deaths of twelve civilians in the La Mon restaurant bombing on the same day, some of whom were burned to death. Initially the British Army downplayed the IRA's claim as published by An Phoblacht, that the helicopter was shot down, on the basis that no hits were found on the wreckage, but finally they acknowledged that the IRA action had caused the crash.

The death of Corden-Lloyd, a former Special Air Service officer, was deeply regretted by the British Army, who regarded him as promising. He was awarded a posthumous mention in dispatches "in recognition of gallant and distinguished service in Northern Ireland". In 1973, Irish republicans had accused Corden-Lloyd and his subordinates of brutality against Belfast Catholics during an earlier tour of the Green Jackets in 1971, at the time of Operation Demetrius.

See also 

 1990 British Army Gazelle shootdown
 1988 British Army Lynx shootdown
 1994 British Army Lynx shootdown
 Battle of Newry Road
 1993 Fivemiletown ambush
 Chronology of Provisional Irish Republican Army actions (1970–79)
List of attacks on British aircraft during The Troubles  
 Provisional IRA South Armagh Brigade

References

External links 

 Barzilay, David (1978). The British Army in Ulster, Volumen 3. Century Services Ltd. 
 Coogan, Tim Pat (1994). The IRA: A History. Robert Rinehart Publishers, 
 Dewar, Michael (1985). The British Army in Northern Ireland. Arms and Armour Press. 

1978 in Northern Ireland
20th century in County Armagh
20th-century aircraft shootdown incidents
Aviation accidents and incidents in 1978
Aviation accidents and incidents in Northern Ireland
Accidents and incidents involving helicopters
Army Air Corps (United Kingdom)
British Army in Operation Banner
Military actions and engagements during the Troubles (Northern Ireland)
Military history of County Armagh
Provisional Irish Republican Army actions
The Troubles in County Armagh
February 1978 events in the United Kingdom
1978 in military history
Conflicts in 1978